Liga 3 may refer to several different football leagues.

 Liga 3 (Georgia), the Georgian third-tier league
 Liga 3 (Indonesia), the Indonesian third-tier league
 Liga 3 (Portugal), the Portuguese third-tier league
 Liga III, the Romanian third-tier league

See also 

 3. Liga (disambiguation)
 Liga (disambiguation)